Liberal internationalism is a foreign policy doctrine that argues two main points: first, that international organizations should achieve multilateral agreements between states that uphold rules-based norms and promote liberal democracy, and, second, that liberal international organizations can intervene in other states in order to pursue liberal objectives. The latter can include humanitarian aid and military intervention. This view is contrasted to isolationist, realist, or non-interventionist foreign policy doctrines; these critics characterize it as liberal interventionism.

History

Liberal internationalism emerged during the nineteenth century. Prominent thinkers included Lionel Curtis, Alfred Zimmern and Norman Angell.

Among policymakers, liberal internationalism influenced British Foreign Secretary and Prime Minister Lord Palmerston, and was developed in the second decade of the 20th century under U.S. President Woodrow Wilson. In this form it became known as Wilsonianism. After World War I apparently manifested among the intellectual founders of the League of Nations and also from various overlapping ideas such as classical radicalism, as well as political parties communions such as International Entente of Radical and Similar Democratic Parties. Daniel Deudney and John Ikenberry have also associated liberal internationalism with foreign policy ideas promoted by Franklin D. Roosevelt. Paul K. MacDonald has linked diplomatic practices developed at the 1899 and 1907 Hague conferences as being key repertoires of subsequent liberal internationalism.

Theory
The goal of liberal internationalism is to achieve global structures within the international system that are inclined towards promoting a liberal world order. It foresees a gradual transformation of world politics from anarchy to common institutions and the rule of law. To that extent, global free trade, liberal economics and liberal political systems are all encouraged. In addition, liberal internationalists are dedicated towards encouraging democracy to emerge globally. Once realized, it will result in a 'peace dividend', as liberal states have relations that are characterized by non-violence, and that relations between democracies are characterized by the democratic peace theory.

Liberal internationalism states that, through multilateral organizations such as the United Nations, it is possible to avoid the worst excesses of "power politics" in relations between nations. In addition, liberal internationalists believe that the best way to spread democracy is to treat all states equally and cooperatively, whether they are initially democratic or not.

According to Abrahamsen, liberal internationalism provides more opportunities to middle powers to advance their economic, security, and political interests.

Examples
Examples of liberal internationalists include former British Prime Minister Tony Blair, U.S. President Barack Obama, and then Secretary of State Hillary Clinton. In the US, it is often associated with the American Democratic Party. Some liberal-leaning neoconservatives shifted towards liberal internationalism in the 2010s. 

Commonly cited examples of liberal interventionism include NATO's intervention in Bosnia and Herzegovina; the 1999 NATO bombing of Yugoslavia; British military intervention in the Sierra Leone Civil War; and the 2011 military intervention in Libya. According to historian Timothy Garton Ash, these are distinct because of liberal motivations and limited objectives, from other larger scale military interventions.

Multilateral institutions, such as UNDP, UNICEF, WHO, and the UN General Assembly, have also been considered examples of liberal internationalism.

According to Ikenberry and Yolchi Funabashi, one of the key pillars of liberal internationalism in practice is the democratic constitution and trade-based prosperity of Japan, which makes Japan a major stabilizer of liberal international order in the Asia-Pacific.

See also
City upon a Hill
Cold War liberal
Cosmopolitan democracy
Empire of Liberty
Humanitarian intervention
Idealism (international relations)
Internationalism (politics)
Liberal hawk
Liberal international order
Liberal institutionalism
Nation-building
Neoconservatism
Perpetual peace

References

Further reading
 

 
Foreign policy
Foreign relations of the United States
International relations theory
Internationalism